Herbert W. "Skip" Virgin was the Edward Mallinckrodt Professor and Chair of the Department of Pathology & Immunology at the Washington University School of Medicine and a member of the National Academy of Sciences.  He is best known for establishing murine norovirus as a model system for studying norovirus biology, for identifying host phenotypes associated with persistent viral infections, for defining alterations to the human virome in the context of different diseases, and for elucidating the roles of autophagy and interferon-stimulated genes during viral infection.

Life
Herbert Virgin was born in Miami, Florida and studied biology at Harvard University as an undergraduate, graduating magna cum laude. He obtained his M.D. and Ph.D. from Harvard Medical School, with his thesis work focusing on host immune responses to Listeria monocytogenes, and completed his residency in internal medicine at Brigham and Women's Hospital. Following post-doctoral training in the laboratory of Bernard Fields, he joined the faculty of the Washington University School of Medicine. He remained at Washington University until 2018, most recently as Chair of the Department of Pathology & Immunology.  Virgin left St. Louis to enter the biomedical industrial sector, and was succeeded as chairman by Dr. Richard J. Cote.

Selected publications

References

Year of birth missing (living people)
Living people
Harvard Medical School alumni
Washington University School of Medicine faculty
American virologists